This is a list of special episodes of the professional wrestling television series Impact!, the flagship television program of the American Impact Wrestling promotion, which debuted on June 4, 2004. Several special episodes have featured pay-per-view-esque cards; from 2013 to 2019, these specials have aired in lieu of monthly pay-per-view events.

List

References

Impact Wrestling
Professional wrestling-related lists